Don't Waste Your Anger is the fifth studio album by Australian punk band The Smith Street Band. It was released via Pool House Records on 17 April 2020 and debuted at number 1 on the ARIA Charts, becoming the band's first number one album.

The album was originally set to be released in June 2020, but was brought forward due to COVID-19 pandemic lockdowns and an uncertainty about when the band will be able to tour it.

The album was recorded and mixed by bassist Michael Fitzy in the band's Bush House Studios in regional Victoria. To promote the album, Wil Wagner performed an acoustic set live on the band's Facebook and conduct live Q&A with band members.

Critical reception
Chloe Grimshaw from The Creative Issue said "Don't Waste Your Anger is the reflective, honest and human album that perfectly accompanies life at the moment." saying the album is "something quite transformative and unapologetically raw".

Track listing

Charts

See also
 List of number-one albums of 2020 (Australia)

References

2020 albums
The Smith Street Band albums